Joost Kooistra (born  in Appelscha) is a former Dutch male volleyball player. He was part of the Netherlands men's national volleyball team. He competed with the national team at the 2000 Summer Olympics in Sydney, Australia, finishing 5th. He played with Monini Marconi Spoleto in 2006.

See also
 Netherlands at the 2000 Summer Olympics

References

External links
 profile at sports-reference.com

1976 births
Living people
Dutch men's volleyball players
Sportspeople from Friesland
People from Ooststellingwerf
Volleyball players at the 2000 Summer Olympics
Olympic volleyball players of the Netherlands
20th-century Dutch people
21st-century Dutch people